Throckmorton Collegiate Independent School District is a public school district based in Throckmorton, Texas (USA).

In 2009, the school district was rated "academically acceptable" by the Texas Education Agency.

In 2018, the name of the district was changed from Throckmorton ISD to Throckmorton Collegiate ISD.

Schools
All three schools (elementary, junior high, and high school) are located on one campus facility with a shared cafeteria. The current principal is Rhonda Riley and the superintendent is Dr. Michelle Cline

References

External links
 

School districts in Throckmorton County, Texas